Towzlu (also Romanized as Towzlū, Toozloo, Tūzlū; also known as Tozlū) is a village in Bizineh Rud Rural District of Bizineh Rud District of Khodabandeh County, Zanjan province, Iran. At the 2006 National Census, its population was 2,085 in 450 households. The following census in 2011 counted 2,214 people in 623 households. The latest census in 2016 showed a population of 2,307 people in 694 households; it was the largest village in its rural district.

References 

Khodabandeh County

Populated places in Zanjan Province

Populated places in Khodabandeh County